The 2017 Commonwealth Weightlifting Championships were held at the Gold Coast Sports and Leisure Centre in Gold Coast, Australia from 4 to 9 September 2017.

The event was held in tandem with that year's Oceania Championships and as a test event for the 2018 Commonwealth Games, for which gold medallists (totals only) in eligible weight categories would directly qualify.

Results shown below are for the senior competition only. Junior and youth results are cited here and here respectively.

Medal table

Medal summary

Men

Women

Medal reallocation

References

External links
Senior results book
Junior results book
Youth results book

Weightlifting
Commonwealth Weightlifting Championships
Commonwealth Weightlifting Championships
Commonwealth Weightlifting Championships
International weightlifting competitions hosted by Australia
Sports competitions on the Gold Coast, Queensland
Commonwealth Weightlifting Championships